Deva is a 1995 Indian Tamil-language romantic action film directed by S. A. Chandrasekhar, starring Vijay, Sivakumar and debutante Swathi. The film revolves around a couple is deeply in love, but encounters opposition from the woman's father, who is head of the village. The father believes the man is not a suitable partner due to his perceived reputation. The film released on 17 February 1995 and had a successful theatrical run of 100 days in Tamil Nadu.

Plot 

The film is a story of romance that centers around two lovers: Deva (Vijay) and Bharathi (Swathi). The two are deeply in love but encounter opposition from Bharadhi's father Gandhidasan (Sivakumar), the head of the village. Gandhidasan believes that Deva is not a suitable suitor due to his perceived reputation throughout the village. Although the son of the well-to-do Raasathi (Raasathi), it comes to light that Gandhidasan's disapproval stems from his relationship with his brother Rajadurai aka Periyavar (Mansoor Ali Khan), who is seemingly apathetic and lackadaisical. The film ends happily with Gandhidasan recognizing that his now son-in-law Deva is actually a really upstanding citizen in the village. Deva and Bharathi overcome all problems and live their lives happily married.

Cast

Soundtrack 
The music was composed by Deva, while the lyrics were written by Vaali, Pulamaipithan and Kavidasan.

Reception 
Thulasi of Kalki praised Vijay for his maturity but advised him not to take risk of singing songs. He also appreciated the cinematographer and choreographer for adding more beauty to the film and concluded that director's screenplay is perfect and ups and downs are okay to keep audience engaged but advised director not to insult women in his next film.

References

External links 
 

1990s romantic action films
1990s Tamil-language films
1995 films
Films directed by S. A. Chandrasekhar
Films scored by Deva (composer)
Indian romantic action films